Helen Jamet FRES is a medical entomologist from the UK, she is deputy director for Vector Control of Malaria at the Bill & Melinda Gates Foundation.

Education and career 
Jamet did a BSc in Applied Biology at the University of Leeds graduating in 1994 and then a Master of Science in Medical Parasitology in 1996 and a PhD in Infectious Diseases at the London School of Hygiene and Tropical Medicine where she graduated in 2002.  She stayed and worked as a research fellow for two years at the LSHTM and then worked as a consultant medical entomologist for the American Biophysics Corporation, testing mosquito traps in the field in Tanzania.

Jamet worked for Vestergaard Frandsen from 2007 to 2018 where she was Project Manager, Head of Entomology and finally global head of Research & Market Access.

Research 
At Vestergaard Jamet helped to develop the first next-generation long lasting insecticide treated bed nets which have two compounds, an insecticide and a synergist Piperonyl butoxide to enhance the action of the insecticide on the mosquito, blocking the enzymes in the mosquito that break down the insecticide.

Her work has also involved compiling data on the effectiveness of insectides against malaria vectors, to see which control methods are needed and map where resistance might be developing; she is also involved in looking for new pesticide compounds that can kill mosquitoes through novel biological mechanisms

Honours and awards 
Jamet is a Fellow of the Royal Entomological Society and of the Royal Society of Tropical Medicine and Hygiene.

References

External links 

 Bill & Melinda Gates Foundation profile

Living people
Year of birth missing (living people)
British entomologists
Fellows of the Royal Entomological Society
Women entomologists
21st-century British scientists
21st-century British women scientists
Alumni of the University of Leeds